Botha (pronounced  in non-rhotic dialects of English) is a common Afrikaans surname, derived from the Friso-Saxon Both. It was brought to South Africa in 1678 by Frederich Botha.

The progenitors of the extended clan were Maria Kickers, her first partner Ferdinandùs Appel, and her later husband Frederich Botha.

Descendants of Ferdinandùs Appel
Prior to her marriage to Frederich Botha, Maria Kickers had an out-of-wedlock child fathered by Ferdinandùs Appel, another Hollander from an Amsterdam family. This child, a son named Theunis, was later adopted by the Bothas. His descendants include:

Louis Botha (1862–1919), Second Boer War general and first Prime Minister of South Africa, often referred to as "General Botha"
Pieter Willem "P.W." Botha (1916–2006), South African prime minister from 1978 to 1984 and state president from 1984 to 1989

Descendants of Frederich Botha
Married in 1714, Kickers and Botha later farmed for a living between Stellenbosch and Somerset West. Today, their legal descendants number around 76,125 people, and include:

Artists, artisans and businesspeople 

Danila Botha (born 1982), South African-born Canadian novelist
Hannah Botha (1923-2007), South African actress
Johan Botha (tenor) (1965–2016), opera singer
Leon Botha (1985-2011), South African artist and progeria victim
Mike Botha (born 1947), South African-born master diamond cutter
Piet Botha (1955-2019), South African rock musician
Roelof Botha (born 1973), South African actuary, former PayPal chief financial officer
Willem Botha (born 1987), South African singer and actor

Politicians, civil servants, and activists

Andries Botha (19th century), Khoikhoi leader in the Cape Colony
Annie Botha (1864-1937), wife of the Prime Minister of the Union of South Africa
Chris Botha (1864-1902), head of police and Boer War general, younger brother of Louis Botha
Cornelius Botha (1932-2014), South African politician
Philip Botha (1851-1901), Boer War general, older brother of Louis Botha
Roelof Frederik "Pik" Botha (1932–2018), South African politician and diplomat
Sandra Botha (born 1945), South African diplomat and ambassador 
Stoffel Botha (1929–1998), South African politician
Theo Botha (born 1960), South African shareholder activist
Thozamile Botha (born 1948), South African politician

Rugby players

Arno Botha (born 1991), South African rugby player
Bernado Botha (born 1988), South African rugby player
Brendon James Botha (born 1980), South African rugby player
Chrysander Botha (born 1988), Namibian rugby player
Dolph Botha (Philip Rudolph, born 1993), South African rugby player
Gary Botha (born 1981), South African rugby player
Hendrik Egnatius "Naas" Botha (born 1958), South African rugby player
John Philip "Bakkies" Botha (born 1979), South African rugby player
Mouritz Botha (born 1982), South African rugby player
Ruan Botha (born 1992), South African rugby player
Tom Botha (born 1990), South African rugby player

Cricketers

Andre Botha (cricketer) (born 1975), South African-born Irish cricketer
Anthony Greyvensteyn Botha (born 1976), South African cricketer
Beverly Botha (born 1953), South African female cricketer
Dewald Botha (born 1991), South African cricketer
Dawid Botha (born 1988), Namibian cricketer
Johan Botha (cricketer) (born 1982), South African born Australian cricketer

Other sportspersons

Adriaan Botha (sprinter) (born 1977), South African sprinter
Andre Botha (bodyboarder) (born 1980), South African bodyboarder
Francois Botha (born 1968), South African boxer
Heidi Botha (born 1968), South African fencer
Johan Botha (athlete) (born 1974), South African middle distance runner
Lukas "Luki" Botha (1930-2006), South African Formula One driver
Riaan Botha (born 1970), South African pole vaulter
Tyler Botha (born 1980), South African skeleton racer
Wendy Botha (born 1965), South African-born Australian surfer

Other uses
Botha, village in the Lundazi district in Eastern Province, Zambia
1354 Botha, asteroid
Anna Elizabeth Botha (née Rossouw, 1922-1997), wife of South African prime minister Pieter Willem Botha (1916-2006), so former South African first lady
Blackburn Botha, Royal Air Force reconnaissance aircraft
Botha, Alberta, Canadian settlement in Alberta
Botha Sigcau (died 1978), former President of Transkei
Botha's Hill, South African settlement in KwaZulu-Natal
Botha's lark (Spizocorys fringillaris), a South African lark
Gunther Botha, South African mercenary in Matthew Reilly's Area 7
Jaapie Botha, fictional South African Police officer in the film The Power of One
Karl Botha, fictional counterfeiter from Pepetela's novels
Louis Botha Avenue, Johannesburg street
Mutro Botha, assassin in the television series Batman Beyond
Regiment Botha, South African Army unit
SATS General Botha, South African warship

References

Surnames
Afrikaans-language surnames
Surnames of Frisian origin
South African families